The 2015 WNBA Finals was the championship series for the 2015 WNBA season of the Women's National Basketball Association (WNBA). On August 26, vegasinsider.com projected that the Minnesota Lynx has the highest odds to win the series (11/10).

The WNBA Finals were under a 2–2–1 rotation. The Lynx held home-court advantage as they had a better regular season record (22–12) than the Fever (20–14).

2015 WNBA regular season

2015 WNBA Playoffs

Indiana Fever

The Indiana Fever finished 20–14, good for third place in the Eastern Conference. The Fever lost their first playoff game against the Chicago Sky, but rallied to win two straight elimination games, setting up a conference final against the New York Liberty. Once again, Indiana lost the first game of the series, but rallied to win two straight to reach the finals for the third time in franchise history, which gave Stephanie White the first rookie head coach to lead her team to the WNBA Finals.

Minnesota Lynx

The Minnesota Lynx finished with the best record in the Western Conference for the fourth time in five year, finishing with a 22–12 record. With the mid-season addition of Sylvia Fowles from the Chicago Sky, the Lynx eliminated the Los Angeles Sparks in three games. The Lynx then swept the Phoenix Mercury in the Western Conference Finals after a controversial foul called on Mercury guard Noelle Quinn on Maya Moore with 1.5 seconds left in the fourth quarter in Game 2, which gave them a chance to win their third WNBA title in five years.

Regular-season series
The Minnesota Lynx won the season series 2–0:

Series summary
All times are in Eastern Daylight Time (UTC−4).

Game 1

Game 2

Game 3

Game 4

Game 5

Rosters

References

Finals
Women's National Basketball Association Finals
2015 in sports in Minnesota
2015 in sports in Indiana
October 2015 sports events in the United States
Minnesota Lynx
Indiana Fever
2010s in Minneapolis
Basketball competitions in Minneapolis
2010s in Indianapolis
Basketball competitions in Indianapolis